The Wonderful Grand Band is an eponymous debut album release by The Wonderful Grand Band.  The album was inspired by music the band played during a six-part television mini-series on the CBC called The Root Seller.  The songs on the album are a mix of traditional music and folk-rock. The album comprises music composed by Emile Benoit and songs written by Ron Hynes.  This album features some of Emile's first recorded music, specifically Emile's Dream which later, in 1980, the album of the same name was released by Emile featuring titles that also appear on The Wonderful Grand Band.  The album also features the first and original version of the widely covered Sonny's Dream which also appears re-recorded on their second album, Living in a Fog.  The album was only available on LP until 2010 when it was reissued for CD.

Track listing

Side one
"The Budgell's Jigs" (Trad.) – 2:42
"Sonny's Dream" (Ron Hynes) – 3:14
"Just Like a Movie Scene" (R. Hynes) – 3:39
"a) The Washroom Reel b) Joe Smallwood's Reel c) The Humours Of Lissadel" (Emile Benoit) – 3:36
"One Last Lover" (R. Hynes) – 2:59
"Maid In France a) Rufus' Tune b) St. Laurent c) The Maid I Ne'er Forgot" – 3:04

Side two
"Take a Chance On Love" (R. Hynes)- 2:21
"For You And Me" (R. Hynes) – 3:27
"a) Piccadilly Sand b) Emile's Dream c) The Long Point Reel" (E. Benoit & Trad.)- 3:26
"Home On The Island" (R. Hynes) – 3:16
"Don't Wake Me Up Too Early" (R. Hynes) – 2:36
"The Jig Is Up" (Trad.) – 1:57

Personnel
Band
Ron Hynes – lead vocals, acoustic guitars, mandolin, banjo
Kelly Russell – fiddle, mandolin, dulcimer
Sandy Morris – acoustic & electric lead guitars
Bryan Hennessey – electric bass, harmonica on 'Take a Chance'
Bawnie Oulton – vocal harmony
Glenn Simmons – acoustic & electric guitars, vocal harmony
Rocky Wiseman – drums

Production
Neil Bishop – engineer
Manny Bucheit – photography
Claude Caines – engineer, punchmaster general, 
The Wonderful Grand Band – producers, cover design & arrangements

References

1978 albums
Wonderful Grand Band albums